The Angola basketball cup is the second most important nationwide annual basketball competition in Angola.

In the preliminary stage, six teams contested in a 2-leg head-to-head playoff with the winners joining the remaining five "higher-ranked" teams for the quarter finals, at which stage, the eight teams will compete in a two-leg knock out play-off, followed by a two-leg semifinal. The final will be played in a single match. Recreativo do Libolo successfully defended its title beating Petro de Luanda in the final 105-95.

2016 Angola Men's Basketball Cup

Preliminary rounds

Final round

2016 Angola Women's Basketball Cup
The 2016 Angolan Women's Basketball Cup is an upcoming event to be held from July 6–10, 2016. The semifinals will take place July 6 and 8, while the finals will take place July 10.

See also
 2016 Angola Basketball Super Cup
 2016 BIC Basket
 2016 Victorino Cunha Cup

References

Angola Basketball Cup seasons
Cup